Roberto Nicolás Fernández Fagundez (born 2 March 1998) is a Uruguayan professional footballer who plays as a midfielder for Uruguayan Primera División club Fénix.

Career
Fernández made his professional debut on 24 October 2015, in a 1–1 draw against Montevideo Wanderers. On 5 May 2018, he scored his first professional goal in a 2–0 win against Atlético Torque. Fernández made his continental debut on 18 August 2016, in a 2–0 loss against Cerro Porteño.

Fernández is a former Uruguay youth international. He was part of Uruguay under-20 team which won 2017 South American U-20 Championship. He has also represented his nation at 2013 South American U-15 Championship and 2015 South American U-17 Championship.

References

Uruguayan footballers
Living people
1998 births
Association football midfielders
Centro Atlético Fénix players
Uruguayan Primera División players